This is a timeline of the Texas Revolution, spanning the time from the earliest independence movements of the area of Texas, over the declaration of independence from Spain, up to the secession of the Republic of Texas from Mexico.

The first shot of the Texas Revolution was fired at the Battle of Gonzales on October 2, 1835. This marked the beginning of the revolution.  Over the next three months, the Texian colonists drove all Mexican army troops out of the province.  .  General Jose Urrea marched half of the troops up the Texas coast in the Goliad campaign, while Santa Anna led the rest of the troops to San Antonio de Bexar.  After a thirteen-day siege, Santa Anna's army defeated the small group of Texians at the Battle of the Alamo and continued east.  Many Texians, including the government, fled their homes in the Runaway Scrape. On March 19 the Texas troops marched into an open prairie outside of Goliad during a heavy fog. When they stopped to rest their animals, Urrea and his main army surrounded them. The Texas force numbered at least 300 soldiers, and the Mexicans had 300 to 500 troops. With no choice but battle, James Fannin chose to stand and fight near Coleto Creek. Santa Anna and his troops searched for the Texian government and the Texian army led by Sam Houston.  On April 21, 1836, the Texans defeated Santa Anna's army at the Battle of San Jacinto; Santa Anna was captured the following day.  The Mexican army retreated back to Mexico City, ending the Texas Revolution. Texas was now an independent colony and later joined the United States.

Prelude to war: 1823–1834

1835

1836

References

Texas Revolution
History of the Southern United States
Texas Revolution
Texas-related lists